In the 1828–29 United States Senate elections were held on various dates in various states. As these U.S. Senate elections were prior to the ratification of the Seventeenth Amendment in 1913, senators were chosen by state legislatures. Senators were elected over a wide range of time throughout 1828 and 1829, and a seat may have been filled months late or remained vacant due to legislative deadlock. In these elections, terms were up for the senators in Class 2.

The Jacksonian coalition, despite its leader's victory in the presidential election, lost a seat in the Senate to the opposing Anti-Jacksonian coalition. Senators who called themselves "Anti-Jacksonian" or "National Republicans" were also called "Adams" or "Adams Men."

Results summary 
Senate party division at the beginning of the 21st United States Congress (1829–1831)

 Majority party: Jacksonian 26
 Minority party: Anti-Jackson 22
 Total seats: 48

Change in composition

Before the elections

As a result of the elections

Race summaries 
Bold states link to specific election articles.

Special elections during the 20th Congress 
In these special elections, the winners were seated during 1828 or before March 4, 1829; ordered by election date.

Races leading to the 21st Congress 
In these regular elections, the winner was seated on March 4, 1829; ordered by state.

All of the elections involved the Class 2 seats.

Special elections during the 21st Congress 
In these special elections, the winners were elected in 1829 after March 4; ordered by election date.

Alabama

Delaware

Georgia 

Georgia had three elections in this cycle.

Georgia (regular)

Georgia (special, class 2)

Georgia (special, class 3)

Illinois

Kentucky

Louisiana

Maine 

Maine had two elections in this cycle.

Maine (regular)

Maine (special)

Massachusetts 

Massachusetts had two elections in this cycle.

Massachusetts (regular)

Massachusetts (special)

Mississippi

New Hampshire

New Jersey 

New Jersey had two elections in this cycle.

New Jersey (regular)

New Jersey (special)

New York (special)

North Carolina 

North Carolina had three elections in this cycle.

North Carolina (regular)

North Carolina (special, class 2)

North Carolina (special, class 3)

Ohio (special)

Rhode Island

South Carolina

Tennessee 

Tennessee had two elections in this cycle.

Tennessee (regular)

Tennessee (special)

Virginia

See also 
 1828 United States elections
 1828 United States presidential election
 1828–29 United States House of Representatives elections
 20th United States Congress
 21st United States Congress

Notes

References

Sources 
 Party Division in the Senate, 1789-Present, via Senate.gov